Federal Highway 25 (Fed. 25) is a tollfree part of the federal highways corridors. It starts in Viñedos Rivier, Aguascalientes, runs east, then runs northeast to San Marcos, Zacatecas, just past Loreto, Zacatecas.

References

025
Aguascalientes
Transportation in Zacatecas